Denistone railway station is located on the Main Northern line, serving the Sydney suburb of Denistone. It is served by Sydney Trains T9 Northern Line services.

History
Denistone station opened on 26 September 1937 with two side platforms. However they were built with provision to be converted to island platforms at a later date. The western platform so converted on 24 October 1978, and the eastern platform on 27 November 1989 when extra lines were opened.

It contains one of Sydney's smaller commuter car-parks. The station is located on a steep 1 in 40 gradient.

The station was earmarked for closure in 2001 due to low patronage but the plan was strongly opposed by the community who eventually won their appeal for it to stay open.

In early 2019 planning for an upgrade to the station commenced with the project set to be completed in 2023.

This upgrade involves two new lifts being built, one for each island platform.

Platforms and services

References

External links

Denistone station details Transport for New South Wales

Railway stations in Sydney
Railway stations in Australia opened in 1937
Main North railway line, New South Wales
Denistone, New South Wales